There are two forms of vehicle classification in Croatia. Vehicles are classified by categories in the driving license and by categories for toll highways.

Driving license classification 
As an EU member, Croatia has a Driving license scheme partly compatible with the European driving licence one.

Toll categories 

Vehicles on motorways are classified into five price classes or categories in accordance with the Ordinance on the amount of tolls on public roads and the Decision on the amount of tolls on motorways issued by the Ministry of Sea, Transport and Infrastructure and published by Croatian Association of Toll Motorways Concessionaires(HUKA).

External links
 HUKA

References 

Road transport in Croatia